Goblin Slayer is an anime series adapted from the light novels of the same title written by Kumo Kagyu and illustrated by Noboru Kannatuki. The 12-episode series was adapted by White Fox, aired from October 7 to December 30, 2018, and was broadcast on AT-X, Tokyo MX, Sun TV, and BS11. The series is directed by Takaharu Ozaki, with scripts penned by Hideyuki Kurata and Yōsuke Kuroda, character designs handled by Takashi Nagayoshi and music composed by Kenichirō Suehiro.

Funimation licensed and produced an English dub for the series, with Crunchyroll simulcast the series internationally.


Episode list

Notes

References

2018 Japanese television seasons
Goblin Slayer episode lists